The 2005–06 UCLA Bruins men's basketball team represented the University of California, Los Angeles in the 2005–06 NCAA Division I men's basketball season.  The UCLA Bruins finished the regular season with a 14–4 record in conference play.  After winning the Pac-10 tournament, the Bruins conference record was 17–4.  The team reached the 2006 NCAA Division I men's basketball tournament championship game, losing to the Florida Gators. The Bruins finished with 32 wins (14 more than the previous season).

Recruiting class

Roster

Schedule

|-
!colspan=9 style=|Exhibition

|-
!colspan=9 style=|Regular Season

|-
!colspan=12 style="background:#;"| Pac-10 Tournament

|-
!colspan=12 style="background:#;"| NCAA tournament

Source

References

UCLA Bruins
UCLA Bruins men's basketball seasons
NCAA Division I men's basketball tournament Final Four seasons
Pac-12 Conference men's basketball tournament championship seasons
UCLA Bruins men's basketball
UCLA Bruins men's basketball
Ucla